Westinghouse High School can refer to:
 Westinghouse High School (Pittsburgh), Pittsburgh Public Schools, Pittsburgh, Pennsylvania
 George Westinghouse Career and Technical Education High School, New York City Department of Education, Brooklyn, New York
 Westinghouse High School (Chicago), Chicago Public Schools, Chicago, Illinois

See also 
 Westinghouse (disambiguation)